Liz Green is an English, Manchester-based, singer-songwriter. In 2007, Green won the Glastonbury Festival Emerging Talent competition. In 2011 she released her debut album, O, Devotion!

Discography

Albums 
 O, Devotion! – 14 November 2011, [PIAS]
 Haul Away! – 14 April 2014, [PIAS]

Singles 
 "Bad Medicine" – 20 August 2007, Humble Soul
 "Midnight Blues" – 2008, Humble Soul
 "Displacement Song" – 22 August 2011, [PIAS]
 "Bad Medicine" – 27 February 2012, [PIAS]

Compilations 
 The Abandoned Recordings – 2008
 Shadow Play – 2010, Humble Soul

References

External links 
 
 Official website

Year of birth missing (living people)
Living people
English women singer-songwriters